Roch Wamytan or Rock Wamytan (born 13 December 1950) is a Kanak politician from New Caledonia. He is currently serving as President of the Congress of New Caledonia since May 2019, having previously been in the position from 2011 to 2012, and from 2013 to 2014. He was also president of the Kanak and Socialist National Liberation Front.

References 

People from Nouméa
Kanak people
1950 births
Living people
Presidents of the Congress of New Caledonia
Caledonian Union politicians